This is a list of films produced by 20th Century Fox from 1935—following a merger between the Fox Film Corporation and Twentieth Century Pictures—and 1999. For subsequent releases, see List of 20th Century Fox films (2000–2020) and List of 20th Century Studios films.

1930s

1940s

1950s

1960s

1970s

1980s

1990s

See also 
 20th Century Fox
 List of 20th Century Fox films (2000–2020)
 :Category:Lists of films by studio

References

External links 

1935
Disney-related lists
Lists of films released by Disney
Twentieth, 1935
20th, 1935